Joan Allen (born August 20, 1956) is an American actress. She began her career with the Steppenwolf Theatre Company in 1977, won the 1984 Drama Desk Award for Outstanding Actress in a Play for And a Nightingale Sang, and won the 1988 Tony Award for Best Actress in a Play for her Broadway debut in Burn This. In the mid-1990s to the early 2000s, Allen received international recognition for a string of critically acclaimed performances. She is also a three-time Academy Award nominee, receiving Best Supporting Actress nominations for Nixon (1995) and The Crucible (1996), and a Best Actress nomination for The Contender (2000).

Allen's other film roles include Manhunter (1986), Peggy Sue Got Married (1986), Tucker: The Man and His Dream (1988), Searching for Bobby Fischer (1993), The Ice Storm (1997), Face/Off (1997), Pleasantville (1998), The Bourne Supremacy (2004), The Upside of Anger (2005), The Bourne Ultimatum (2007), Death Race (2008), and The Bourne Legacy (2012). She won the Canadian Screen Award for Best Supporting Actress for the 2015 film Room. She has also starred in the Broadway plays The Heidi Chronicles (1988), Impressionism (2009), and The Waverly Gallery (2018).

Early life and education 
Allen, the youngest of four children, was born in Rochelle, Illinois, the daughter of Dorothea Marie (née Wirth), a homemaker, and James Jefferson Allen, a gas station owner. She has an older brother, David, and two older sisters, Mary and Lynn. Allen attended Rochelle Township High School, and was voted most likely to succeed. She first attended Eastern Illinois University, performing in a few plays with John Malkovich, who was also a student, and then Northern Illinois University, where she graduated with a Bachelor of Fine Arts degree in theater.

Career 
Allen began her performing career as a stage actress and on television before making her film debut in the movie, Compromising Positions (1985). She became a member of the Steppenwolf Theatre Company ensemble in 1977 when John Malkovich asked her to join. She's been a member ever since. In 1984, she won a Clarence Derwent Award for her portrayal of Hellen Stott in And a Nightingale Sang. Allen's work with Steppenwolf has included productions of Three Sisters, Waiting For The Parade, Love Letters, The Marriage of Bette and Boo, and The Wheel. In 1989, Allen won a Tony Award for her Broadway debut performance in Burn This opposite Malkovich. She also starred in the Pulitzer Prize-winning play The Heidi Chronicles, with Boyd Gaines at the Plymouth Theatre. The show was met with critical praise, receiving six Tony Award nominations and winning Best Play. Allen received her second Tony Award nomination for her performance.

She received Academy Award nominations for Best Supporting Actress for her roles as Pat Nixon in Nixon (1995) and as Elizabeth Proctor, a woman accused of witchcraft, in The Crucible (1996). She was also nominated for Best Actress for her role in The Contender (2000), in which she played a politician who becomes the object of scandal.

She had starring roles in the drama The Ice Storm, directed by Ang Lee, and the action thriller Face/Off, directed by John Woo, both released in 1997, as well as in the comedy-drama Pleasantville (1998).

In 2001, Allen starred in the mini-series The Mists of Avalon on TNT and earned an Primetime Emmy Award nomination for the role. She also starred as Rachel McAdams mother in the 2004 movie The Notebook. In 2005, she received many positive notices for her leading role in the comedy/drama The Upside of Anger, in which she played an alcoholic housewife.

She played CIA Department Director Pamela Landy in The Bourne Supremacy, The Bourne Ultimatum and The Bourne Legacy. Allen appeared in Death Race, playing a prison warden.

In 2009, Allen starred as Georgia O'Keeffe in Lifetime Television's 2009 biopic chronicling the artist's life. Allen returned to Broadway after a twenty-year absence in March 2009, when she played the role of Katherine Keenan in Michael Jacobs' play Impressionism opposite Jeremy Irons at the Gerald Schoenfeld Theatre. The play was met with mixed reviews from critics. The New Yorker wrote the play "is as awkward as it is sublime", noting its "brazen sweetness" and "openhearted humor".

Allen voiced the character Delphine in Bethesda Softworks' 2011 video game The Elder Scrolls V: Skyrim. She also lent her voice talents in the Thomas Nelson audio Bible production known as The Word of Promise. In this dramatized audio, Allen played the character of Deborah. The project also featured a large ensemble of well known Hollywood actors including Jim Caviezel, Lou Gossett Jr., John Rhys-Davies, Jon Voight, Gary Sinise, Christopher McDonald, Marisa Tomei and John Schneider.

In 2015, Allen signed for the leading role in the ABC drama series The Family, playing the role of villainous and manipulative mayor and matriarch of her family.

After a nine-year absence from Broadway, Allen played Ellen Fine in the critically acclaimed Broadway premiere production of the Kenneth Lonergan play The Waverly Gallery in 2018, alongside Elaine May, Lucas Hedges, and Michael Cera at the John Golden Theatre.

After a five-year break from acting in movies and television, she co-starred with Julianne Moore, Clive Owen, and Jennifer Jason Leigh in Lisey's Story, the 2021 Apple TV miniseries adapted by Stephen King from his own novel. It was Allen's second King adaptation after playing the lead role in the 2014 movie, A Good Marriage.

Personal life 
In 1990, Allen married actor Peter Friedman. They divorced in 2002 and have one daughter, Sadie, born in February 1994.

Filmography

Film

Television

Audio plays

Audiobooks

Video games

References

External links 

 
 
 Joan Allen at Steppenwolf Theatre Company
 
 
 
 

1956 births
20th-century American actresses
21st-century American actresses
Actresses from Illinois
American film actresses
American stage actresses
American television actresses
American video game actresses
American voice actresses
Best Supporting Actress Genie and Canadian Screen Award winners
Clarence Derwent Award winners
Drama Desk Award winners
Eastern Illinois University alumni
Living people
Northern Illinois University alumni
People from Rochelle, Illinois
Steppenwolf Theatre Company players
Tony Award winners
American musical theatre actresses